Carl Vogt (1817–1895) was a German scientist, philosopher and politician.

Carl Vogt may also refer to:
 Carl Henry Vogt or Louis Calhern (1895–1956), American actor
 Carl W. Vogt, president of Williams College

See also 
 Carl de Vogt (1885–1970), German film actor